Ciomăgești is a commune in Argeș County, Muntenia, Romania. It is composed of nine villages: Beculești, Bratia, Ciomăgești, Cungrea, Dogari, Fedeleșoiu, Giuclani, Păunești and Răduțești.

References

Communes in Argeș County
Localities in Muntenia